Apostolos Angelis (born 24 June 1993) is a cross-country skier from Greece. He competed for Greece at the 2014 Winter Olympics in the sprint race and finished 74th out of 86 competitors and failed to advance.

Biathlon results
All results are sourced from the International Biathlon Union.

World Championships
0 medals

*During Olympic seasons competitions are only held for those events not included in the Olympic program.
**The single mixed relay was added as an event in 2019.

References 

1993 births
Living people
Cross-country skiers at the 2014 Winter Olympics
Cross-country skiers at the 2018 Winter Olympics
Cross-country skiers at the 2022 Winter Olympics
Greek male cross-country skiers
Olympic cross-country skiers of Greece
Greek male biathletes
Sportspeople from Ioannina